Qoli Dizaji (also Romanized as Qolī Dīzajī; also known as Qolī Dīzaj) is a village in Avajiq-e Jonubi Rural District, Dashtaki District, Chaldoran County, West Azerbaijan Province, Iran. At the 2006 census, its population was 267, in 49 families.

References 

Populated places in Chaldoran County